Arkady Alexandrovich Sobolev (1903–1964) was a Russian Soviet diplomat who served as the Soviet ambassador to the United Nations between 1955 and 1960. He was a specialist in international law. He was also under-secretary for Security and Political Affairs between 1946 and 1949 and Soviet Ambassador to Poland between 1951 and 1953.
He died in Moscow following a long illness.

Alger Hiss, Secretary-General of the San Francisco Conference, where the UN Charter was drafted and signed, spoke about the role of Sobolev and US delegate Leo Pasvolsky:
"they were the draftsmen of the Charter in San Francisco. Now, the outline had been written before; I'm talking about
the specific language which is a very important part of any treaty, I think it was Pasvolsky and Sobolev who were really responsible for the form the Charter took." Sobolev and Pasvolsky had the primary responsibility to "put the various drafts together into a working text."

References

1903 births
1964 deaths
Permanent Representatives of the Soviet Union to the United Nations
Ambassadors of the Soviet Union to Poland